Nola apicalis is a moth in the family Nolidae. It was described by George Hampson in 1903. It is found in Ghana, Nigeria and Uganda.

References

apicalis
Moths of Africa
Insects of West Africa
Insects of Uganda
Moths described in 1903